Phacusa birmana is a moth of the family Zygaenidae. It was described by Oberthür in 1894. It is found in Myanmar.

References

Moths described in 1894
Procridinae